Sevenia trimeni, Trimen's tree nymph, is a butterfly in the family Nymphalidae. It is found in Cameroon, the Democratic Republic of the Congo, Angola, Zambia and Namibia. The habitat consists of marshy areas bordered by medium tree cover.

Adults are on wing year round.

Subspecies
Sevenia trimeni trimeni (Angola, northern Namibia, Zambia)
Sevenia trimeni major (Rothschild, 1918) (Cameroon to the Democratic Republic of the Congo)

References

Butterflies described in 1899
trimeni
Butterflies of Africa
Taxa named by Per Olof Christopher Aurivillius